Vaitele is a town on the Samoan island of Upolu. It is located on the central-north coast of the island, to the west of the capital Apia. Its neighboring villages are Vaigaga, Elisefou, Vaiusu, Talimatau, Vailoa, and Emau. 

Vaitele has an estimated population of 7,972 according to the 2016 census.

References

Populated places in Tuamasaga